Like the Roman: The Life of Enoch Powell is a 1998 book by the English writer Simon Heffer. It is a biography of the politician Enoch Powell. The title is taken from Powell's 1968 Rivers of Blood speech when Powell quoted Virgil's Aeneid: "As I look ahead, I am filled with foreboding; like the Roman, I seem to see the River Tiber foaming with much blood".

Reception
Ian Aitken reviewed the book in the New Statesman: "At 1,024 pages, it would have benefited from some judicious cutting. But for all its length, it is never tedious. Heffer writes with the same lucidity as his subject, but happily without Powell's corkscrew-like sentence construction." In 2014, Sathnam Sanghera selected Like the Roman as one of the "top 10 books of the Midlands" for an article in  The Guardian. Sanghera wrote: "Powell remains a highly controversial figure, but if you want to understand the story of postwar immigration in Britain, and, arguably, postwar British politics at large, you need to read this book."

The book was shortlisted for the 1999 Political Book of the Year and the 1999 Channel 4 Political Book of the Year Award.

References

1998 non-fiction books
Biographies about politicians
Books about British politicians
Books about politics of the United Kingdom
British biographies
English non-fiction books
English-language books
Enoch Powell
Weidenfeld & Nicolson books